The Colt Model 1871–72 Open Top is a metallic cartridge rear-loading .44-caliber revolver introduced in 1872 by the Colt's Patent Fire Arms Manufacturing Company. This handgun was developed following two patents, the first one in 1871 and the second one in 1872, it is estimated that the production span lies primarily between February 1872 and June 1873. There is therefore still some confusion when naming it. It is sometimes named Colt Model 1871 or Colt Model 1872 but at this time the most common accepted names are Colt Model 1871–72 Open Top, Colt Model 1871–72 or simply Colt Open Top.

Development 
When Rollin White's request of extension for his breech-loading revolvers patent was rejected by the American Government in January 1870 the Colt's Patent Fire Arms Manufacturing Company started working on its own metallic cartridge rear-loaders. Up until then, it had been only practicing the so-called Richards-Mason conversions. The Colt company continued converting muzzle-loading percussion revolvers into rear-loaders until 1878, but in 1871 Colt's had patented at least two rear-loading revolvers using metallic cartridges: the Colt House Revolver and the Open Top. The House revolver went into production the same year in 1871 but the Open Top didn't start production until 1872, although a pocket version of the Open Top, a completely different design, went on sale as of 1871, the Colt Open Top Pocket Model Revolver.

While the House and Cloverleaf revolvers were chambered in the .41 caliber, relatively well known at the time, William Mason, the engineer working on the design of the Open Top, chose the more powerful .44 Henry cartridge. The trigger and revolving mechanism were based on the same design as previous Colt revolvers, the well-improved cap & ball percussion guns that made the Colt's company prestige status. Mason brought some innovations to his gun: apart of the breech-loading cylinder, he designed unique frame, cylinder and barrel for the first Colt revolver with non-interchangeable parts with the older percussion pistols and moved the rear sight to the rear of the barrel as opposed to the hammer or the breechblock of the earlier efforts.
Chambered in .44 caliber, the gun was submitted to the US Army for testing in 1872. The Army rejected the pistol and asked for a more powerful caliber with a stronger frame. Mason redesigned the frame to incorporate a topstrap, similar to the Remington revolvers, and placed the rear sight on the rear of the frame; he consulted with Richards on some other improvements. The first prototype of the new gun was still chambered in .44 rimfire, but this new gun was chambered for the newest caliber known as the .45 Colt. This new design started production in 1873, giving birth to a new model, the Colt Single Action Army, and a new serial numbering.

The frame of early Open Top revolvers were marked COLT'S/PATENT, later models sported the so-called "Two July" patent marking, also found on the 1851 Navy-, 1861 Navy- and 1860 Army-conversion revolvers. The "Two July" patents were also found on very early Colt Single Action Army revolvers.

Specifications 
 Production period: 1872-1873
 Total production: Circa 7,000
 Barrel length: 7,5"
 Capacity: 6-round cylinder
 Fire Modes: Single Action
 Loading Modes: Breech-loading

Legacy 
In 1871 and 1872, the nonstop improvement of the Colt Open Top lead to the creation of the better-known Colt Single Action Army revolver.

Cimarron Firearms of Fredericksburg, Texas, imports a replica of the Open-Top revolver that is based on an antique Open Top that the company sent to Uberti to reverse-engineer. The replica revolver differs in one aspect, a safety has been placed on the hammer.

See also 
 Colt House Revolver
 Colt Single Action Army

References 

Colt revolvers
Single-action revolvers
Guns of the American West
Black-powder pistols
Police weapons